Yousef Shawarbeh is the 40th and current mayor of Amman, Jordan. A lawyer by training, he was appointed in August 2017.

References 

Mayors of Amman
Year of birth missing (living people)
Living people